Kyiv has Ukraine's largest concentration of universities, colleges, and research institutions.

Universities and Colleges
 Hrinchenko University
 Shevchenko University
 Aviation University
 University of Construction and Architecture
 University of Culture and Arts
 Cherniakhovsky University of Defense
 Hetman Economic University
 University of Economy and Technology of Transport
 University of Food Technologies
 University of Information-Communication Technologies
 International University
 University of Law
 University of Life and Environmental Sciences
 Linguistic University
 Bogomolets Medical University
 University "Kyiv-Mohyla Academy"
 Drahomanov Pedagogical University
 University of Physical Culture and Sports
 Technical University "Kyiv Polytechnic Institute"
 Slavic University
 International Solomon University
 Karpenko-Karyi University of Theater, Film, and Television
 University of Technologies and Design
 University of Trade and Economics
 University of Tourism, Economy and Law
 Transport University

Academies 

 Academy of attorneys
 Academy of municipal administration
 Academy of Labor, Social Relations and Tourism
 Academy of Communal Economy
 Diplomatic Academy
 Children Academy of Arts
 Municipal Academy of Variety and Circus Arts
 Interregional Academy of Personnel Management
 Academy of State Administration
 Academy of Managerial Staff in Culture and Arts
 Academy of Visual Arts and Architecture
 Academy of Management
 Petro Chaikovsky National Music Academy of Ukraine
 National Academy of Agrarian Sciences of Ukraine

Institutes 
 Institute of Decorative Applied Arts and Design
 St. Thomas Aquinas Institute of Religious Sciences
 Institute of Tourism

Research institutions
 Bogolyubov Institute for Theoretical Physics
 Dobrov Center for Scientific-Technical Potential Research and History of Science
 Glushkov Institute of Cybernetics
 Holodny Institute of Botany
 Institute for Nuclear Research
 Institute of Cell Biology and Genetic Engineering
 Institute of Colloidal Chemistry and Chemistry of Water
 Institute of Environmental Geochemistry
 Institute of Gas
 Institute of Geochemistry, Mineralogy and Ore Formation
 Institute of Geography
 Institute of Geological Sciences
 Institute of History
 Institute of Mathematical Machines and System Problems
 Institute of Molecular Biology and Genetics of NASU
 Institute of Physics
 Institute of Plant Physiology and Genetics
 Institute of Renewable Energy
 Institute of World Economy and International Relations
 NASU Institute of Electrodynamics
 Kyiv Laboratory for Artificial Intelligence
 Ovcharenko Institute of Biocolloidal Chemistry
 Potebnya Institute of Ukrainian Language
 Shevchenko Institute of Literature
 Shmalhausen Institute of Zoology
 Skovoroda Institute of Philosophy
 Subbotin Geophysics Institute
 Ukrainian Space Research Institute
 Vernadsky National Library of Ukraine

See also
 Open access in Ukraine

References

Education in Kyiv

Kiev
Kiev
Universities